Elachista differens is a moth of the family Elachistidae. It is found in the Alps.

The length of the forewings is 3.5–4 mm in males and 2.5–4 mm in females. The forewing ground colour is mottled black with a bronzy sheen. The base is shining silvery and the fascia from before the middle of the costa to the middle of the dorsum are silvery with a bluish or greenish reflection. There is a triangular costal spot, which is creamy white at the costa, but towards the middle of the wing silvery just beyond the opposite silvery tornal spot. There is an irregular third spot between the tornal spot and the apex, formed by some silvery scales. The hindwings are grey.

The larvae feed on Carex ferruginea. They mine the leaves of their host plant.

References

differens
Moths described in 1978
Moths of Europe